A Ticket for Everyone is a live album by English pop punk band Busted. It contains twelve tracks recorded during the Manchester leg of their A Present for Everyone tour, plus the studio version of "Thunderbirds Are Go!", which had not previously been included on an album in the United Kingdom. The album contains live versions of the group's singles, as well as a cover of the 1978 Undertones song "Teenage Kicks" and album track "That Thing You Do". The Continental version of the album omits "She Wants to Be Me", due to contractual issues, and the studio version of "Thunderbirds Are Go!", as it was previously issued on the 2004 reissue of A Present for Everyone in Continental Europe. The DVD version omits the live performance of Thunderbirds Are Go but includes the music video as a bonus feature. The DVD also includes a cover of the 2003 Black Eyed Peas song Where Is the Love? and the album tracks Why, Britney, Better Than This, Fake and Nerdy.

Personnel
Busted
James Bourne – electric and acoustic guitar, co-lead vocals
Charlie Simpson – lead guitar, co-lead vocals 
Matt Willis – bass, co-lead vocals
Additional musicians
John Fields (record producer)
Damon Wilson – drums
Chris Banks – keys
Chris Leonard - guitar

Background
Bourne, Simpson, and Willis were augmented by Chris Banks, Damon Wilson, and Chris Leonard. On bbc.co.uk, Adam Cumiskey stated: "The live element of this album is slightly staid: there's no improvisation in the songs; they sound exactly like the singles. However, with their swagger and confidence... they manage to resist sounding like a contestant in a battle of the bands competition".

Unlike their two studio albums, A Ticket for Everyone was only a minor hit on the UK Albums Chart, peaking at number 11. Busted officially split up two months after its release. An accompanying DVD featuring footage from the Manchester concerts was released with the same title. The DVD went Platinum in the UK.

Track listing

The DVD release includes a documentary, Puntercam, Teenage Kicks in colour and the music videos of Thuderbirds Are Go, Crashed the Wedding and What I Go to School For as special features.

Charts

Weekly charts

Year-end charts

Certifications

References

Busted (band) albums
Island Records live albums
2004 live albums
2004 video albums
Live video albums